Colen is a surname and given name.

Notable people with this name include:

Surname
 Alexandra Colen (born 1955), Belgian politician
 Beatrice Colen (1948-1999), American actress
 Dan Colen (born 1979), American artist
 Kimberly Colen (1957-2001), American author

See also

Given name
 Colen Campbell (1676-1729), Scottish architect
 Colen Ferguson, American politician

Other
 Colen Donck, Dutch-American estate in New York

See also
 Coolen
 Coleen (disambiguation)